Musabeyli (also, Musabekly and Musabekpy) is a village and municipality in the Agsu Rayon of Azerbaijan.  It has a population of 612.

References 

Populated places in Agsu District